Wichí Lhamtés Güisnay or Wiznay is a Wichí language. Wichí Lhamtés Güisnay had an estimated 15,000 speakers in 1999 in Argentina. The language is centered in the Pilcomayo River region. Other names for the language include Güisnay, Mataco, Mataco Güisnay, Mataco Pilcomayo, and Wichí Lhamtés. A grammar book has been written for the language.

The Wichí languages are predominantly suffixing and polysynthetic; verbal words have between 2 and 15 morphemes. Alienable and inalienable possession is distinguished. The phonological inventory is large, with simple, glottalized  and aspirated stops and sonorants. The number of vowels varies with the language (five or six).

Phonology 

 Aspirated sounds [, ~] only occur as allophones of /, /.
 /, / can also have allophones of [, ].
 /, / can have allophones [, ] word-medially, when occurring after //. [] occurs when // is preceding the sequence .
 // can also be heard as [] word-medially and word-finally.

 // can have an allophone of [].

See also
Wichí Lhamtés Nocten
Wichí Lhamtés Vejoz

Notes

Matacoan languages
Languages of Argentina